Saline may refer to:

 Saline (medicine), a liquid with salt content to match the human body
 Saline water, non-medicinal salt water
 Saline, a historical term (especially US) for a salt works or saltern

Places
 Saline, Calvados, a commune in Normandy, France
 Saline, Fife, a village in Fife, Scotland
 Saline Island, an islet in Grenada
 Saline River (disambiguation), several rivers

United States
 La Saline, Missouri, an abandoned community in Ste. Genevieve County, Missouri
 Saline City, former name of ghost town Drawbridge, California
 Saline, Louisiana
 Saline, Michigan
 Saline, Texas
 Saline, Utah, a ghost town
 Saline Bayou, Winn Parish, Louisiana
 Saline Branch, a tributary of the Vermilion River in Illinois
 Saline City, Indiana
 Saline City, Missouri
 Saline County (disambiguation), several counties
 Saline Creek (disambiguation), several streams in Missouri
 Saline High School (disambiguation)
 Saline Range, a mountain range in California
 Saline Township (disambiguation), several townships
 Saline Valley, a valley in California

People 
 Antonio Salines (1936–2021), Italian actor and director
 Carol Saline, American author and journalist
 Ludovic Saline (born 1989), French professional footballer

See also
 Grande Saline (disambiguation)
 
 Salinity
 Salina (disambiguation)